The River Thames is the second-longest river in the United Kingdom, passes through the capital city, and has many crossings.

Counting every channel – such as by its islands linked to only one bank – it is crossed by over 300 bridges. If taking cuts – excavated channels – to be measurements of river, its  course west of Tilbury, traversing   has 27 tunnels, six public ferries, one cable car link, and one ford. From end to end a channel of the Thames can be seen, mostly its main flow, which is passed over by 138 bridges. These are listed here with 2 former bridges and a seasonal festival bridge.  Over 162 other bridges link to such places as typical or man-made islands or across an array of corollary and lesser side channels (backwaters), particularly in and around Oxford and the non-village channel of Ashton Keynes — these are not listed.

The river's lower estuary is shallow – but wide – and has no crossing east of Tilbury, the easternmost half as most broadly defined which even extends to the end of the rivers Medway and Crouch.

Barrier and boundary
Until sufficient crossings were established, the river provided a formidable barrier for most of its course – in post-Roman Britain during the Dark Ages Belgic-Celtic tribal lands and Anglo-Saxon kingdoms and subdivisions were defined by which side of the river they were on. In the latter's system of English counties continued by predominantly Norman England and for some centuries thereafter, the river formed a mutual limit of counties. After rising in Gloucestershire, the river flows between, on the north bank, the historic counties of Oxfordshire, Buckinghamshire, Middlesex and Essex; and on the south bank, the counties of Wiltshire, Berkshire, Surrey, and Kent. However the many permanent crossings that have been built over the centuries have changed the dynamics and made cross-river development and shared responsibilities more practicable.

In 1911 Caversham, on the north bank, was transferred into Berkshire. In 1965, with the creation of Greater London, the London Borough of Richmond upon Thames united areas formerly in Middlesex and Surrey; and at the same time two urban districts in Middlesex (united in 1974) became part of Surrey. Further changes in 1974 moved some of the boundaries away from the river. For example, much of the north west of Berkshire including Wallingford, Abingdon and Wantage became part of Oxfordshire, and some southern parts of Buckinghamshire became part of Berkshire, including Slough, Eton and Wraysbury. The number of county councils has fallen (and some others have dwindled in area) in England in favour of increased localisation.

Lessening these last changes, in the sports of rowing and skiffing the river banks are referred to by their traditional county names, and in football and cricket the traditional counties also, often, persist.

History of crossings

The original crossings over the Thames would all have been fords- typically on gravel beds.  Well known ones include Wallingford and Oxford, but it is likely that there was a prehistoric ford where the Romans built London Bridge. In the upper reaches of the Thames, the river depth was raised by dams and in the lower reaches it was raised by embankments, so gradually most fords were lost. At least one regular ford remains, at Duxford.

Many of the present road bridges over the river are on the sites of earlier fords, ferries and wooden structures. The earliest known major crossings of the Thames by the Romans were at London Bridge and Staines Bridge. At Folly Bridge in Oxford the remains of the Saxon forerunner can be seen, and medieval stone ones such as Wallingford, Newbridge in west Oxfordshire and Abingdon Bridges are still in use. In today's outer south-west London, Kingston's retail and not insignificant commercial prowess, particularly street markets and as an entertainments hub. is rooted in the years of its having the only crossing between London Bridge and Staines until the beginning of the 18th century; today's bridge has been twice widened, confirming its continuing importance.

Proposals to build bridges for Lambeth/Westminster and Putney/Fulham in around 1670 were defeated by the Rulers of the Company of Watermen, since it would cut the trade of the then 60,000 rivermen plying ferry services and who were noted as a pool of naval reserves. During the 18th century, many stone and brick instances were built – from new or to replace existing structures – in London and further up the river. These included Westminster, Putney, Datchet, Windsor and Sonning Bridges. Several central London road bridges were built in the 19th century, most conspicuously Tower Bridge, the only bascule bridge on the river, which enables some types of ocean-going ships to pass beneath it. The most recent road bridge sites are the bypasses at Isis Bridge and Marlow By-pass Bridge and for motorways such as the two for the M25: Queen Elizabeth II Bridge and M25 Runnymede Bridge.

The development of the railways resulted in a spate of bridge building in the 19th century, including Blackfriars and Charing Cross (Hungerford) Railway Bridges in central London, and the simple but majestic three, of grand arch design, by Isambard Kingdom Brunel at Maidenhead, Gatehampton and Moulsford.

The world's first underwater tunnel was the Thames Tunnel by Marc Brunel built in 1843, designed for horse-drawn carriages but used as a pedestrian route; since 1869 the tunnel has carried trains on the East London Line. The Tower Subway (1870) was briefly used for a railway; later came all the deep-level tube lines. Two road tunnels were built in East London at the end of the 19th century, the Blackwall Tunnel and the Rotherhithe Tunnel; and the latest tunnel is the Dartford Crossing.

Many footbridges were made across the weirs that were built on the non-tidal river, and some of these remained when the locks were built, such as at Benson Lock. Some, above Oxford, have survived when the weir was lost, as at Hart's Weir Footbridge. Around the year 2000 several were added, as part of the Thames Path or for the Millennium. These include Temple, Bloomers Hole, the Hungerford Footbridges and the Millennium Bridge in distinct, aesthetic but durable, forms.

Six ferries cross the river:
The Woolwich Ferry is one of two in the Thames Gateway, but the other some miles east is a foot/bicycle ferry only. The one between Woolwich and North Woolwich is the eastern link between the North and South Circular roads.
The ferry clearly within south-west London is a touristic link between the visitor attractions Ham House and Marble Hill House or all of the amenities of Twickenham.
Upstream the three on the reaches between Hampton Court Palace and Windsor Castle are foot/bicycle ferries such as the Hampton or the Shepperton to Weybridge Ferry; the latter is the only non-firm crossing for any part of the Thames Path. The path has two land and bridge based pavement variants there along quite quiet roads, a choice of an intermittent suburban high street, or a historic church square, for those not wishing to use the shorter ferry route.

Note on the listing

The list is from the estuary to the source. A few of the crossings listed are public foot bridges using walkways across lock gates and then bridges parallel to or on top of the associated weir(s) to the non-lock-associated bank. Most of the other locks on the River Thames also have walkways across their lock gates and/or weirs, but these do not completely cross the river, or are restricted to authorised personnel only, and are therefore not listed.

Also operating are boat services, ranging from year-round in London to seven or fewer months (including the summer) serving upper stretches. Whilst their main purpose is not to carry people across the river, several bring about one or more crossings but usually not to points facing each other.

North Sea to London

Proposed
The Lower Thames Crossing is an awaiting-planning-consent road tunnel close to the Thames Cable Tunnel that may open in 2028.

East London

Under construction
 The Silvertown Tunnel began construction in August 2020 and should be completed in 2025. This will relieve the Blackwall Tunnels between the Greenwich Peninsula and West Silvertown and to allow larger HGVs and double-decker buses to cross the river at this point.

Proposed 

 An extension of the Docklands Light Railway across the river to Thamesmead is proposed.
 The Rotherhithe crossing, a pedestrian and cycle crossing between Rotherhithe and Canary Wharf, was originally proposed as a bridge, but Transport for London abandoned plans for a bridge in 2019, and has since explored establishing a ferry service instead.

Central London

Former
 At least two Emergency Thames Bridges were erected as a precaution against destructions during World War II. The first was built from Victoria Embankment to County Hall, London in 1942 before being demolished in 1948. Between the same years stood another, between Millbank outside the Tate Britain and Lambeth.

Planned 

 Nine Elms-Pimlico cycle and pedestrian bridge

South West London

Planned 
 Diamond Jubilee Footbridge, a pedestrian bridge adjacent to Battersea Railway Bridge, granted planning permission in 2013.

London to Windsor

Former
 The Datchet Bridge, built in 1707, was demolished in 1848, and replaced by the Albert and Victoria bridges.

Windsor to Reading

Former
 A footbridge was built in 2012, for the London Olympics, to enable spectators of the rowing events held at Dorney Lake to gain access from Windsor Racecourse.  It was removed after the Olympics.

Reading to Oxford

Oxford to Cricklade

Cricklade to the source 
Not all of the bridges above Cricklade are listed below. For example, there are a number of small agricultural bridges allowing access between fields, and bridges to properties in Ashton Keynes that are not mentioned.

The river splits as it passes through Ashton Keynes.

See also 

Islands in the River Thames
Locks and weirs on the River Thames
List of bridges in London
London River Services
Thames Path
Tunnels underneath the River Thames

Notes

References

Further reading 
 Tucker, Joan (2012). Ferries of the Upper Thames. Amberley Publishing. .

External links 
 

 
Thames
Thames
Crossings
Thames
Crossings of the River Thames
Thames